Richie Stanaway (born 24 November 1991) is a racing car driver from New Zealand.

Career

New Zealand
Born in Tauranga, Stanaway was originally from a motocross background, before making the switch to speedway at the age of twelve. Following that came a brief foray into kart racing prior to making his formula car debut in 2007 after being selected for the New Zealand SpeedSport Scholarship. He competed in the 2007/08 Formula First championship finishing third overall as the highest placed rookie.

Stanaway then made the jump to the New Zealand Formula Ford Championship with Hamilton-based, debutant team TSR Racing alongside team-mate Martin Short. Prior to National championship he raced in the winter series to prepare, winning numerous races in the process with the newly imported Mygale chassis. Stanaway won the 2008/09 New Zealand Formula Ford Championship with fourteen race wins, becoming only the second driver in history to win the title as a rookie.

He then competed in the 2009 Australian Formula Ford Championship with Adelaide-based, Team BRM, making their debut in the Formula Ford championship after a long history of Formula 3 experience. During his Australian Formula Ford campaign in April 2009, Stanaway made his debut in New Zealand's Toyota Racing Series during a one-off appearance on the Hamilton 400 street circuit, scoring both pole positions and winning both races on debut. He then had to pull out halfway through the Australian Formula Ford Championship to take up testing and racing opportunities in the ADAC Formula Masters Championship in Germany. Despite missing six of the races, Richie finished sixth place in the 2009 Australian Formula Ford Championship taking one race win and six podium finishes.

Europe
In July 2009 Stanaway took up a testing opportunity at the EuroSpeedway Lausitz with Ma-Con Motorsport, a German team competing in the ADAC Formula Masters Championship. The test was organized by Tauranga businessman Maurice O' Reilly, a past investor of New Zealand Indy 500 winner, and Indycar series champion Scott Dixon. Stanaway impressed and was offered a race seat for the remaining six races of the 2009 ADAC Formula Masters Championship held at Nürburgring, Sachsenring and Oschersleben. The required budget was raised through a group of investors and on 22 August 2009 Richie made his European debut at the famous Nürburgring circuit. During the six races, he scored two pole positions and numerous podium finishes, and following the signing of a management contract with RRT Holdings, headed by businessman Martin Reiss, the decision was made to return to contest the full ADAC Formula Masters Championship in 2010.

For the 2010 ADAC Formula Masters Championship Stanaway dominated proceedings, taking twelve race wins and finished no lower than second place throughout the whole championship. Following that he completed tests with 2010 Formula Renault 2.0 Eurocup championship winning team, Koiranen Bros. Motorsport at Barcelona's Circuit de Catalunya, also a test with ATS-Formel 3 cup (German Formula 3) team Van Amersfoort Racing in Oschersleben, and a thorough testing program with Tech-1 racing in Formula Renault 2.0. Richie then made his racing debut in the United Kingdom, competing in the Formula Renault UK winter cup with Atech-GP which took place at Snetterton and Pembrey, he took a race win and numerous podium placings over the six race series.

Richie was then released from his management contract with Martin Reiss to then sign with Gravity Sport Management, a management group headed by Lotus-Renault Formula One team principal Eric Boullier, and contested the 2011 ATS-Formel 3 cup (German Formula 3) with Dutch team Van Amersfoort Racing. He replaced Pedro Nunes for the remainder of the 2011 GP3 Series season with the pace-setters, Lotus ART, he will begin at the penultimate round of the championship in Belgium. He finished 8th in the first race and therefore started from pole in the second, where he kept the lead and won the race.

In November 2011 Stanaway tested the new BMW M3 DTM car as one of three young drivers and then in December he tested for Formula Renault 3.5 Series team Gravity–Charouz Racing in the invite-only test at Aragon, Spain where he topped the times on the first two days and finished the three-day test with the fastest overall time.

Touring Cars

He made his Supercars debut for Super Black Racing in 2016, co-driving with Chris Pither in the Pirtek Enduro Cup series. He impressed on debut in Sandown, fighting his way from a pit-stop down up to 3rd with slick tyres on a damp track. His team were caught out by a safety car and would eventually drop to 17th and one lap down. In 2017 Stanaway competed in the Sydney round of the Super2 Series, winning the final race. He then drove in the Pirtek Enduro Cup with Cameron Waters, winning the Sandown 500 from pole position. They then lead the Bathurst 1000 before an incident on a restart after the safety car, breaking the rear wing. They repaired the car and they went on to finish 16th, 3 laps down. They also finished in 2nd the first race of the Gold Coast 600, but suffered steering damage in the second race, resulting in a finish position of 21st. It was announced in early December that Stanaway will drive full-time in the Supercars Championship with Tickford Racing.

In 2019 he moved to Garry Rogers Motorsport after a poor season in 2018. He aggravated a previous neck injury and missed seven races  making a return at The Bend SuperSprint. At the Gold Coast 600 he was stood down for missing an autograph signing  but reinstated at the next round at Sandown. After a difficult two years in Supercars, Stanaway retired from the sport in November 2019.

In 2021, Peter Adderton from Boost Mobile floated the idea of running a Wildcard entry for Stanaway and four time Bathurst winner Greg Murphy in the upcoming Bathurst 1000. The idea gained massive fan support, helping to convince Stanaway and Murphy to return for the first time since 2019 and 2014 respectively. On 8 June 2021 it was confirmed that the two would return in an Erebus Motorsport run Boost Mobile supported entry. On 12 November 2021 the wildcard was postponed due to travel restrictions between Australia & New Zealand. In late April 2022 Erebus Motorsport confirmed that the Wildcard would be revived for the upcoming Bathurst 1000. There were plans to run Stanaway & Murphy in solo events prior to Bathurst but those plans fell through, the two will get three test days prior to the 1000 with the first set to be run at Winton Motor Raceway on June 7th.

Racing record

Career summary

Complete GP3 Series results
(key) (Races in bold indicate pole position) (Races in italics indicate fastest lap)

Complete Formula Renault 3.5 Series results
(key) (Races in bold indicate pole position) (Races in italics indicate fastest lap)

Complete Porsche Supercup results
(key) (Races in bold indicate pole position) (Races in italics indicate fastest lap)

Complete FIA World Endurance Championship results

Complete GP2 Series results
(key) (Races in bold indicate pole position) (Races in italics indicate fastest lap)

24 Hours of Le Mans results

Complete European Le Mans Series results

Supercars Championship results

Bathurst 1000 results

References

External links
 
 
 Profile on Racing Reference

1991 births
Living people
Sportspeople from Tauranga
New Zealand racing drivers
New Zealand speedway (auto racing) drivers
Toyota Racing Series drivers
ADAC Formel Masters drivers
German Formula Three Championship drivers
New Zealand GP3 Series drivers
FIA Institute Young Driver Excellence Academy drivers
World Series Formula V8 3.5 drivers
Porsche Supercup drivers
British GT Championship drivers
FIA World Endurance Championship drivers
24 Hours of Daytona drivers
24 Hours of Le Mans drivers
WeatherTech SportsCar Championship drivers
GP2 Series drivers
European Le Mans Series drivers
ART Grand Prix drivers
Supercars Championship drivers
Garry Rogers Motorsport drivers
DAMS drivers
Aston Martin Racing drivers
Ma-con Motorsport drivers
Van Amersfoort Racing drivers
Charouz Racing System drivers
Status Grand Prix drivers
Nürburgring 24 Hours drivers